Rolling Hills is a hamlet in southern Alberta, Canada within the County of Newell. Rolling Hills was founded in 1939 by the Prairie Farm Rehabilitation Administration (PFRA) with settlers from dried out regions of Saskatchewan and Alberta.

Demographics 

The population of Rolling Hills according to the 2020 municipal census conducted by the County of Newell is 263.

Economy 
Rolling Hills’ primary industry is agriculture. Specialty crops grown in the area include dry edible beans, sugar beets, potatoes, seed canola and seed alfalfa. Cattle have always been a major part of the agricultural landscape in the Rolling Hills area.

Education 
One school, serving kindergarten through grade 9, is located in Rolling Hills.

See also 
List of communities in Alberta
List of designated places in Alberta
List of hamlets in Alberta

References 
 

Hamlets in Alberta
Designated places in Alberta
County of Newell